Georgios Markoulas (born 16 November 1982) is a Greek weightlifter. He competed in the men's light heavyweight event at the 2004 Summer Olympics. and he was fourth.

References

1982 births
Living people
Greek male weightlifters
Olympic weightlifters of Greece
Weightlifters at the 2004 Summer Olympics
Sportspeople from Ioannina